The Shashtar, Sheshtar or Shashtay (probably from Persian Şeş-tar ششتار, meaning six-string) is a stringed musical instrument of the lute family. It was mentioned historically by Evliya Çelebi and Abd al-Qadir Maraghi. It is or was played in Iran/Persia, Afghanistan, Azerbaijan and elsewhere.  It may have been developed during the Safavid dynasty from the tambur. Like the tambur, it has a floating bridge and a wooden soundboard (not skin like the rubab etc). The 6 gut strings were in 3 double courses, and thus it may be a forerunner of the Tar.

References

Lutes
Necked bowl lutes
String instruments
Iranian inventions